The Elliott Highway is a highway in the U.S. state of Alaska that extends 152 miles (245 km) from Fox, about 10 miles (16 km) north of Fairbanks, to Manley Hot Springs. It was completed in 1959 and is part of Alaska Route 2.

Route description
The highway is paved and in generally good condition year-round between Fairbanks and the junction with the Dalton Highway, but reverts to an unpaved road for the final  to Manley Hot Springs. This portion of the road, particularly in winter, can be very challenging to navigate due to overflow of ice and water on the road, high-wind areas, and drifting snow. There is no cellular telephone service available on the Elliott Highway north of Wickersham Dome, though there is fuel available in Minto, and traffic, particularly past the Dalton Highway cutoff, can be extremely sparse. Travelers should always carry emergency supplies and fuel enough for  when driving this highway.

Near Manley Hot Springs there is a 50-mile side road to Tanana over Tofty. This road was built 2014-2016 for a cost of $13 million.
The road ends on the south side of the Yukon River, so a boat trip or an ice road is also needed to reach Tanana.

Minto is also served by a side road off the main highway called the Minto Road. The Dalton Highway begins 73 miles (118 km) north of Fox at its junction with the Elliott Highway.

Future
A  road project (Manley Hot Springs–Nome) is being discussed in Alaska. It has been estimated (in 2010) to cost $2.3–2.7 billion, or approximately $5 million per mile.

The road to Nome has received hesitation because of the cost. Former governor Sean Parnell wanted, as a beginning, to build a road from Manley Hot Springs to Tanana, around 35 miles length, and the road to Tanana was opened in 2016, ending at the Yukon River. The last 12 miles is private property, and belongs to the village corporation Tozitna Limited. The parking lot by the river is for residents, shareholders and tribal members only. During winters an ice road is made on the river ice, enabling road access for a few months; weather depending. Any continuation would require a fairly expensive bridge to be built. A ferry is an option also, but then the river would be impassable when the ice is too weak for driving but too thick for a ferry.

See also
 List of Alaska Routes

Junction list

''See the article on Alaska Route 2 for an updated major intersections list.

References

Transportation in Fairbanks North Star Borough, Alaska
State highways in Alaska
Yukon–Koyukuk Census Area, Alaska
Transportation in Unorganized Borough, Alaska
Proposed state highways in the United States